Anne-Gaëlle Retout (born 15 August 1980 at Caen) is a French athlete, who specializes in race walking.

Biography

Prize list  
 French Championships in Athletics   :  
 winner of 10 000 m walk 2012   
 winner of the 20 km walk in 2008 and 2010

Records

Notes and references

External links  
 
  profile Anne-Gaëlle Retout on the site of the FFA  
 sports-info profile on Retout

1980 births
Living people
French female racewalkers
Sportspeople from Caen